Mercer is a village in the Waikato District Council area of the Waikato region of the North Island of New Zealand. It is 70 km north of Hamilton and 58 km south of Auckland, on the east bank of the Waikato River, 2 km south of its confluence with the Mangatāwhiri River.

Prior to the creation of the Auckland supercity in 2010, Mercer was in Franklin District, part of the Auckland Region.

History
The first attack in the invasion of the Waikato took place on 17 July 1863, when about 15 Māori defenders were killed at Koheroa (a kilometre north – see 1:50,000 map). The village was named after Captain Henry Mercer, who was killed at Rangiriri in November 1863. The navy river gun-boat Pioneer was wrecked on the Manukau bar in 1866 and one of the gun turrets forms part of the war memorial.

The North Island Main Trunk railway opened to Mercer station on 20 May 1875. A crash in 1940 killed the driver and fireman. Until 1958 many trains stopped for refreshments. The station closed in 1986.

The beached hulls of steamers operated until 1976 by Caesar Roose can be seen on the west bank of the river just south of Mercer. W. Stevenson & Sons Ltd bought the remains of the Roose sand dredging business in the mid 1980s and, after dredging ended in 1997, redeveloped  of its yard with a petrol station and a food court.

Bridge 

In 1965 Roose offered $100,000 towards the $343,000 bridge to replace the Mercer ferry.

Demographics
The SA1 area is part of the larger Pōkeno Rural statistical area.

Mercer had a population of 123 at the 2018 New Zealand census, an increase of 9 people (7.9%) since the 2013 census, and an increase of 18 people (17.1%) since the 2006 census. There were 45 households, comprising 66 males and 57 females, giving a sex ratio of 1.16 males per female. The median age was 41.3 years (compared with 37.4 years nationally), with 24 people (19.5%) aged under 15 years, 21 (17.1%) aged 15 to 29, 66 (53.7%) aged 30 to 64, and 12 (9.8%) aged 65 or older.

Ethnicities were 63.4% European/Pākehā, 41.5% Māori, and 4.9% Pacific peoples. People may identify with more than one ethnicity.

Although some people chose not to answer the census's question about religious affiliation, 51.2% had no religion, 24.4% were Christian, 4.9% had Māori religious beliefs, and 2.4% were Muslim.

Of those at least 15 years old, 12 (12.1%) people had a bachelor's or higher degree, and 27 (27.3%) people had no formal qualifications. The median income was $29,100, compared with $31,800 nationally. 15 people (15.2%) earned over $70,000 compared to 17.2% nationally. The employment status of those at least 15 was that 51 (51.5%) people were employed full-time, 12 (12.1%) were part-time, and 9 (9.1%) were unemployed.

Education

Former residents
 Allan Marshall (1851–1915), river captain
 Te Puea Hērangi (1883–1952), Māori leader
 Caesar Roose (1886–1967), ship owner and operator

See also
 Waikato Expressway and State Highway 1

References

External links

 Google Street View of Caesar Roose Bridge
 Waikato river levels
 Waikato water pollution
 1943 map of electricity lines, showing businesses, etc

Waikato District
Populated places in Waikato
1863 establishments in New Zealand
Populated places on the Waikato River